Laleh Seddigh (born 1977 in Tehran) is an Iranian racing driver. She has been described as 'one of the most celebrated sportswomen in the Islamic Republic of Iran'.

Biography

Early life
Seddigh started driving at the age of 13, taught by her father. She passed her driving test at 18.

Career
Seddigh had to get special permission from a local ayatollah in order to compete against men. Permission was given since driving is not deemed a contact sport, and on the condition that Seddigh would confirm to dress-codes.

Seddigh has said that she will not leave Iran as she is 'most effective' in promoting women's rights in Japan. Seddigh has trained other female racing drivers.

Media
Seddigh's story is featured in a BBC TV documentary called Girl Racer, transmitted in 2008.

See also 
 List of famous Iranian women
 Iranian women's movement

References

External links

Iranian racing drivers
Female racing drivers
1977 births
Living people
Iranian sportswomen